Pablo Hurtado Castaneda (born 27 March 1932) is a Colombian former cyclist. He competed at the 1956 Summer Olympics and the 1960 Summer Olympics.

Major results
1957
 1st Stage 11 Vuelta a Colombia
1958
 1st Stage 1 Vuelta a Colombia
1959
 1st  Team time trial, Central American and Caribbean Games (with Efraín Forero and Ramón Hoyos)
 1st Stage 4 Vuelta a Colombia
1960
 1st Stages 1, 3 & 7 Vuelta a Colombia

References

External links
 

1932 births
Living people
Colombian male cyclists
Olympic cyclists of Colombia
Cyclists at the 1956 Summer Olympics
Cyclists at the 1960 Summer Olympics
Sportspeople from Boyacá Department
20th-century Colombian people
21st-century Colombian people